The following is a list of Dutch composers.

A

B

C

D

E

F

G

H

J 
Guus Janssen (born 1951)
Willem Jeths (born 1959)

K

L

M

N

O

P

R

S

T

V

W

Z

See also
Lists of composers
List of Belgian classical composers

Dutch
 
Composers